Needmore, Texas may refer to:

 Needmore, Bailey County, Texas
 Needmore, Terry County, Texas